Route 16 may refer to:
 One of several highways - see List of highways numbered 16
 One of several public transport routes - see List of public transport routes numbered 16
 Mystic Valley Parkway station, also called Route 16 - a proposed light rail station in Medford, Massachusetts
 Route-16 (video game), a 1981 video game